Princess Erika (born Erika Dobong'na; 5 April 1964, Paris) is a French singer and actress with Cameroonian origins. She is particularly known for her reggae songs "Trop de bla-bla" ou "Faut qu'j'travaille".

Biography
In 1982, Erika formed with her sisters a band named Blackheart Daughters, then joined the band Princess and the Royal Sound, with whom she made several tours, opening for Jamaican singer Dennis Brown. In 1988, she recorded "Trop de bla-bla" in London and achieved a minor success in France (#39 on the Top 50, but later, the song became famous for being used for a TV advert for MMA). She released the single "Tendresse" and her first album in 1992. She opened the concerts for Les Négresses Vertes. In 1995, she released her second studio album, D'origine, and the lead single, "Faut qu'j'travaille", hit No. 15 in France. Two years later, she recorded a duet with Marc Lavoine, "Les Hommes sont des Femmes comme les autres". She participated in Les Enfoirés and wrote several songs for various artists such as "Embrasse-moi" for the Nubians. 

In 2004, she also participated in the compilation Agir Réagir intended to raise funds to help the Moroccans who survived an earthquake on 24 February 2002. In 2005, she was a contestant on La Ferme Célébrités. She organized the four editions of the concerts , performed with many other artists in a charity fundraiser. She covered the songs "La Vie en rose" and "J'ai encore rêvé d'elle" with Pierpoljak on the cover album Il est 5 heures Kingston s'éveille. She was an occasional actress in films and theatre, and appeared in Le Petit Trésor.

Family
Erika has two children : Julien (born in 1982) and Oudima (2003).

Discography

Albums
 1992 : Princess Erika
 1995 : D'origine
 1999 : Tant qu'il y aura
 2005 : À l'épreuve du temps
 2011 : Juste Erika

Singles
 1988 : "Trop de bla-bla" – No. 39 in France
 1989 : "Tendresse"
 1995 : "Faut qu'j'travaille" – No. 15 in France, No. 38 in Belgium (Wallonia)
 On s'en va
 C'est ma vie
 Nouvelle Génération
 Sur la route du reggae

Filmography
 1989 : Maman de Romain Goupil
 1998 : Charité biz'ness
 2005 : Les Marins perdus
 2005 : Quand les anges s'en mêlent...
 2005 : Le Jardin de Papa de Zeka Laplaine
 2006 : Camping Paradis (TV film)
 2008 : Camping Paradis 2 (TV film)

References
 Princess Erika's peak positions in France, on Lescharts.com

External links
 Official site
 
 

1964 births
French women singers
Living people
Singers from Paris
French people of Cameroonian descent
La Ferme Célébrités participants